Roxita albipennata is a moth in the family Crambidae. It was described by Inoue in 1989. It is found in Japan.

References

Crambinae
Moths described in 1989